Bathysphyraenops is a genus of fish in the family Howellidae, the oceanic basslets. They are native to the deep waters of the tropical oceans.

Species
The currently recognized species in this genus are:
 Bathysphyraenops declivifrons Fedoryako, 1976
 Bathysphyraenops simplex A. E. Parr, 1933

References

Howellidae
Marine fish genera
Taxa named by Albert Eide Parr